The Anchorite is a 1976 Spanish drama film directed by Juan Estelrich. It was entered into the 27th Berlin International Film Festival where Fernando Fernán Gómez won the Silver Bear for Best Actor.

Cast
 Fernando Fernán Gómez - Fernando
 Martine Audó - Arabel Lee
 José María Mompín - Augusto
 Charo Soriano - Marisa
 Claude Dauphin - Boswell
 Maribel Ayuso - Clarita
 Eduardo Calvo - Calvo
 Ángel Álvarez - Alvarez
 Ricardo G. Lilló - Lillo (as Ricardo Lillo)
 Isabel Mestres - Sandra
 Luis Ciges - Wis-Burte
 Sergio Mendizábal
 Antonio Almorós - Norberto
 Vicente Haro - Maitre

References

External links

1976 films
1970s Spanish-language films
1976 drama films
Films with screenplays by Rafael Azcona
Spanish drama films
1970s Spanish films